Margaret Haig Mackworth, 2nd Viscountess Rhondda ( Thomas; 12 June 1883 – 20 July 1958) was a Welsh peeress, businesswoman and active suffragette who was significant in the history of women's suffrage in the United Kingdom.

Early life
Margaret Haig Thomas was born on 12 June 1883 in London. Her parents were industrialist and politician David Alfred Thomas, 1st Viscount Rhondda, and Sybil Haig, also a suffragette. In her autobiography, Margaret wrote that her mother had 'prayed passionately that her baby daughter might become feminist', and she indeed became a passionate activist for women's rights.

An only child, she was raised at Llanwern House, near Newport, until the age of 13, when she went away to boarding school, first to Notting Hill High School then St Leonards School, in St Andrews. In her late teens she concluded that none of the Bible was likely to be true, and that it was probable that there was no hereafter. The process of arriving at these conclusions was an exceedingly painful one, which led her largely to keep her thoughts on religion to herself, afraid of initiating the same pain in others. In 1904, aged 19, she took up a place at Somerville College, Oxford, where she studied history. Despite her tutors providing positive feedback on her academic progress, she returned to Llanwern to live with her family after two terms.

Working for her father at the Consolidated Cambrian company headquarters in Cardiff Docks on a salary of £1,000, she spent three years as a debutante.

Women's suffrage

She married Newport landowner Humphrey Mackworth in 1908 at 25, joined the Women's Social and Political Union (WSPU) that year and became secretary of its Newport branch. Between 1908 and 1914, she took the campaign for women's suffrage across South Wales, often to hostile and stormy meetings. Thomas was involved in protest marches with the Pankhursts and, jumping onto the running board of Liberal Prime Minister H. H. Asquith's car in St Andrews, was attacked by a crowd. But she found that being a member of the women's suffrage movement gave her adventure and excitement, and a sense of being some use in the scheme of things. It was a draft of fresh air in what she described as her ‘padded, stifled life’.

In June 1913, Thomas attempted to set fire to a Royal Mail letter-box with a chemical bomb as a way of inspiring her WSPU branch to greater militancy. This resulted in a trial at the Sessions House, Usk, and after refusing to pay a £10 fine, she was sentenced to serve a one-month period in jail there. She was released after only five days after she had gone on a hunger strike.

Thomas was given a Hunger Strike Medal 'for Valour' by WSPU.

When Emmeline Pankhurst died in June 1928, it was Kitty Marshall, Rosamund Massey and Lady Rhondda who arranged her memorials. They raised money for her gravestone in Brompton Cemetery and a statue of her outside the House of Commons, which she had frequently been prevented from entering. Money was also raised to buy the painting that had been made by the fellow suffragette Georgina Brackenbury so that it could be given to the National Portrait Gallery. It was unveiled by Stanley Baldwin in 1930.

First World War and sinking of RMS Lusitania
On the outbreak of the First World War, she accepted the decision by the WSPU leadership to abandon its militant campaign for suffrage. She was by this time working for her father as his confidential secretary and ‘right-hand man’. Thomas had great pride and belief in his daughter, and had argued with her on equal terms since she was twelve or thirteen. She thus went with him when he was sent by David Lloyd George to the United States to arrange the supply of munitions for the British armed forces.

Her father became aware of his daughter's depressive state, and although she brushed her father's concern aside, he became aware of tensions within her marriage. On 7 May 1915, she was returning from the United States on the RMS Lusitania with her father and his secretary, Arnold Rhys-Evans, when it was torpedoed at 14:10 by German submarine U-20. Her father and his secretary made it onto a lifeboat since they had been blown overboard, but she spent a long period in clinging to a piece of board before she was rescued by the Irish trawler "Bluebell", as recalled in her 1933 autobiography, This Was My World. By the time she was rescued and taken to Queenstown, she had fallen unconscious from hypothermia. After a period in hospital, she then spent several months recuperating at her parents' home.

During the war Rhondda helped to place Belgian refugees in Monmouthshire and was then employed by the government to encourage women to undertake war work in essential industries, most notably in agriculture. In early 1918 she was promoted to Chief Controller of women's recruitment at the Ministry of National Service in London to advise on women's recruitment policy, experience which she later used to good effect.

Peerage
On 3 July 1918 her father died. While the Rhondda Barony died with him, the title of Viscount Rhondda passed to Margaret by special remainder, which Thomas had insisted on from King George V when he was offered the honour.

After her father's death, Lady Rhondda subsequently tried to take his seat in the House of Lords by citing the Sex Disqualification (Removal) Act 1919 which allowed women to exercise "any public office". After initially being accepted, the Committee of Privileges membership was altered and her request was rejected. She was supported for many years by Lord Astor, whose wife Nancy had been the first woman to take her seat in the British House of Commons.

Shortly after Lady Rhondda's death in 1958, women entered the Lords for the first time thanks to the Life Peerages Act 1958. Five years later, with the passage of the Peerage Act 1963, hereditary peeresses were also allowed to enter the Lords.

Business interests
She succeeded her father as chair of the Sanatogen Company in February 1917. In total, she was a director of 33 companies throughout her life, having inherited 28 directorships from her father. Most of her business interests were in coal, steel and shipping via Consolidated Cambrian Ltd. She was passionate about increasing the number of women in the corporate world, and at this time was probably the best-known businesswoman in Britain. However, with the slump in coal prices during the late 1920s, the collieries of Consolidated Cambrian fell into receivership, and its assets later sold to GKN. After the collapse of Consolidated Cambrian, her personal accounts show that her outgoings always exceeded her income.

In the summer of 1919, Rhondda was involved in creating and chairing the Efficiency Club, a networking organisation for British businesswomen, which she envisioned would have four aims: to promote greater efficiency and co-operation between established businesses and professional women, to encourage leadership and self reliance amongst all women workers, to form a link between businesses and professional women for their mutual benefit and to work towards the admission of women to the British Chambers of Commerce.

She was elected as the Institute of Directors' first female president in 1926, having been a member of its Council since 1923. In 2015 the Institute launched the annual Mackworth Lecture in her honour.

Women's rights
In 1918 Rhondda lobbied for the government's proposed Ministry of Health to have women properly represented by an all-woman advisory council, and she formed a Watching Group to monitor progress. Rhondda wanted more than a few token women on committees, and was especially concerned that the importance of maternity and infant welfare should be recognised. In the event, the government's new Ministry of Health Act 1919 created a Consultative Council on General Health Questions which had a majority of women members and which was chaired by Rhondda herself.

In 1919 Rhondda founded the Women’s Industrial League with the aim of seeking equal training and employment opportunities for women in industry, and to resist a return to pre-war conditions which largely designated women's labour as unskilled with low pay and poor prospects. She was particularly concerned that the Ministry of Labour seemed to recognise only three forms of work for women – tailoring, laundry and domestic service. The Women's Industrial League publicised the issue and tried to hold the government to its war-time promises relating to working women.

In 1920 Rhondda took advantage of the Sex Disqualification (Removal) Act 1919 to become one of the first four women Justices of the Peace in the County of Monmouth though she did not sit often.

In May 1926 Rhondda was a founding member of the Open Door Council which was formed to advocate for equal pay, status and opportunity for women. As such, in 1929 she led a deputation to the Home Secretary asking him to repeal the Factory and Workshop Act 1901 which prevented women taking well-paid jobs in mining and other industries.

Time and Tide
Aside from inheriting her father's publishing interests, Rhondda had founded in 1920 Time and Tide magazine, at first a left-wing feminist weekly magazine, but later a more rightist general literary journal. She was the long-time editor of the magazine and sustained it with a large portion of her inheritance.

Rhondda recalled that she had always wanted to edit a paper. She knew that most weekly reviews lost money, but accepted this as the price of getting at the ‘keystone people’ - the inner group in society who influenced the general public. Rhondda appointed an all-woman board and ensured that the journal was entirely controlled, staffed and edited by women. She took over the editorship herself in 1926 and continued in the post until her death. George Bernard Shaw, who wrote for the paper, was one of those who had a high opinion of her abilities as an editor and, according to Rebecca West, who was also a contributor, she insisted on a very high standard of writing.

Rhondda saw Time and Tide primarily as a platform from which to advocate women's equality and the journal constantly drew attention to women's advances such as the election of women to parliament, the appointment of women as magistrates and as members of juries, and the granting of degrees to women at Oxford University. Under her editorship the journal became ‘an innovative, imaginative and adaptable weekly paper’ which soon achieved a circulation of between 12,000 and 15,000 copies.

In 1928 Rhondda gave the journal an enhanced literary focus, publishing more book reviews and work by modern women novelists including Virginia Woolf, and from 1931 there was a new emphasis on international issues and world politics. This reflected Rhondda's own concerns about threats to peace. Similarly, in the 1940s the journal's content became increasingly right-wing as Rhondda's own political views moved to the right. Circulation then rose to 40,000 despite the loss of progressive readers, but Rhondda still had to subsidise the journal out of her own pocket.

Six Point Group
In 1921, Rhondda set up and chaired the Six Point Group, an action group that focused heavily on the equality between men and women and the rights of the child.

The group's manifesto of equal rights for women within the workplace and for mothers and children sought the following:
 Satisfactory legislation on child assault
 Satisfactory legislation for the widowed mother
 Satisfactory legislation for the unmarried mother and her child
 Equal rights for Guardianship for married parents
 Equal pay for Teachers
 Equal opportunities for men and women in the Civil Service

These were issues which had not been covered by the Sex Disqualification (Removal) Act 1919 and which Rhondda believed to be easily understandable and attainable. They had all been considered and debated publicly, and some could be achieved without the need for parliamentary legislation. Rhondda argued, for example, that if the government stopped dismissing women civil servants when they married, local authorities would probably follow suit.

The Representation of the People Act 1918 had given women the vote only if they were over 30 and fulfilled a property qualification. In 1926 Rhondda focussed the Six Point Group on equal rights and led it in a new campaign to complete the enfranchisement of women, starting with a mass demonstration in Hyde Park. The Equal Political Rights Campaign Committee was then formed with Rhondda in the chair. Further demonstrations, meetings and lobbying followed until the Representation of the People (Equal Franchise) Act 1928 finally gave women over twenty-one the vote on the same terms as men.

A Canadian steamship, the Lady Mackworth, was named after her.

Personal life 
In 1908 she married Humphrey Mackworth, who later inherited his father's baronetcy. They divorced in December 1922. She never remarried. She lived with Time and Tide magazine editor Helen Archdale in the late 1920s. She later had a close relationship with Winifred Holtby, the author of South Riding, who was in a "friendship" with the writer Vera Brittain. She subsequently spent 25 years living with writer and editor Theodora Bosanquet, who acted as amanuensis to Henry James from 1907 to 1916.

Posthumous recognition 
In 2015, the annual Mackworth Lecture was launched by the Institute of Directors in her honour.

Her name and picture (and those of 58 other women's suffrage supporters) are on the plinth of the statue of Millicent Fawcett in Parliament Square, London, unveiled in 2018. Lady Rhondda was one of five women shortlisted in 2019 to be portrayed in the first statue of a woman to be erected in Cardiff. The statue is being made by Jane Robbins and is planned to be installed in Newport in 2024.

Arms

See also
 History of feminism
 List of suffragists and suffragettes

References

Further reading

External links
Portrait of Margaret Haig Thomas in the UK Parliamentary Collections
Humanist Heritage - Lady Margaret Rhondda

1883 births
1958 deaths
People educated at St Leonards School
Welsh feminists
Welsh suffragists
British magazine founders
Viscounts in the Peerage of the United Kingdom
Hereditary women peers
Wives of baronets
People from Newport, Wales
Women of the Victorian era
People educated at Notting Hill & Ealing High School
British women in World War I
Alumni of Somerville College, Oxford
Shipwreck survivors
RMS Lusitania
Hunger Strike Medal recipients